Severgnini is an Italian surname. Notable people with the surname include:

Beppe Severgnini (born 1956), Italian journalist, essayist and columnist
Edoardo Severgnini (1904–1969), Italian cyclist

Italian-language surnames